Bratseth is a surname. Notable people with the surname include:

 Rune Bratseth (born 1961), Norwegian footballer